Theodore Wores (August 1, 1859 – September 11, 1939) was an American painter born in San Francisco, son of Joseph Wores and Gertrude Liebke.  His father worked as a hat manufacturer in San Francisco.

Life
Wores began his art training at age twelve in the studio of Joseph Harrington, who taught him color, composition, drawing and perspective.  When the San Francisco School of Design opened in 1874, Wores was one of the first pupils to enroll.  After one year at that school under the landscape painter Virgil Macey Williams, he continued his art education at the Royal Academy in Munich where he spent six years.  He also painted with William Merritt Chase and Frank Duveneck.  Wores returned to San Francisco in 1881.  He went to Japan for two extended visits and had successful exhibitions of his Japanese paintings in New York City and London, where he became friends with James Abbott McNeill Whistler and Oscar Wilde.

He visited Hawaii and Samoa in 1901-1902 and established a home in San Francisco about 1906.  He visited Hawaii for a second time in 1910–1911.  He was married in 1910 in San Francisco to Carolyn Bauer. For the remainder of his career, Wores painted the coast on the western edge of San Francisco.  He died from a heart attack in San Francisco Sept. 11, 1939.

Collections
His most famous work is The Lei Maker, which is on permanent display at the Honolulu Museum of Art.  The Addison Gallery of American Art (Andover, Massachusetts), the Crocker Art Museum (Sacramento, California), the Smithsonian American Art Museum (Washington, DC), and the White House (Washington, DC), are among the public collections that also hold works by Wores.

Works

 1900 - Custom House, Monterey, oil on pressboard, Shasta State Historic Park, Shasta County, California
 1901 - Hawaiian House, oil on canvas
 1901 - The Lei Maker, oil on canvas, Honolulu Museum of Art,  Honolulu, Hawaii

References
 Forbes, David W., Encounters with Paradise: Views of Hawaii and its People, 1778-1941, Honolulu Academy of Arts, 1992, pp. 204–224.
 Gerdts, William H., The World of Theodore Wores, Iris & B. Gerald Cantor Center for Visual Arts at Stanford University, Stanford, Calif., 1999, 
 Hover, Laurie, "Lizzie", Honolulu, December 1970, pp. 46–47
 Pitzer, Pat, An Artist-Adventurer in Turn-of-the-century Hawaii, Honolulu, May 1987, pp. 69–101

External links
Artwork by Theodore Wores

Footnotes

19th-century American painters
19th-century American male artists
American male painters
20th-century American painters
20th-century American male artists
Painters from California
1859 births
1939 deaths
Artists from San Francisco